Olenecamptus nigromaculatus is a species of beetle in the family Cerambycidae. It was described by Pic in 1915.

References

Dorcaschematini
Beetles described in 1915